Synegia is a genus of moths in the family Geometridae. It was described by Achille Guenée in 1857.

Description
Palpi obliquely porrect (extending forward), roughly scaled and reaching beyond the frons. Hind tibia not dilated. Forewings with vein 3 from near angle of cell. Vein 7, 8 and 9 stalked from near upper angle. Veins 10 and 11 stalked, connected or anastomosing (fusing) with vein 12, and vein 10 connected or anastomosing with veins 8 and 9.

Most species in the genus have pale yellow or brownish wings banded and speckled with reddish gray. Many species have the fasciae marked by black dots. The similar dots also occur at the disc and margins of most species, though the type species (Synegia botydaria (Guenée, 1858)) has no black markings at all. Some have more extensive black or brownish-gray clouding, and this can vary within a species. The body is delicate, legs and abdomen in males often elongate. The male antennae can be filiform (thread-like) or bipectinate (feather-like).

Species
The following is an incomplete list of some species

 Synegia aemula Warren, 1894
 Synegia albibasis Warren, 1906
 Synegia angusta Prout, 1924
 Synegia asymbates Prout, 1932
 Synegia atriplena Warren, 1906
 Synegia botydaria Guenée, 1858
 Synegia camptogrammaria Guenée, 1858
 Synegia clathrata Warren, 1906
 Synegia commaculata Warren, 1907
 Synegia conflagrata Hampson, 1912
 Synegia cumulata Warren, 1907
 Synegia decolorata Warren, 1903
 Synegia divergens Wehrli, 1939
 Synegia echmatica Prout, 1929
 Synegia erythra Hampson, 1891
 Synegia esther Butler, 1881
 Synegia eumeleata Walker, 1861
 Synegia fasciata Warren, 1906
 Synegia frenaria Swinhoe, 1902
 Synegia fulvata Warren, 1906
 Synegia hadassa Butler, 1878
 Synegia hormosticta Prout, 1925
 Synegia ichinosawana Matsumura, 1925
 Synegia imitaria Walker, 1861
 Synegia incepta Warren, 1907
 Synegia inconspicua Butler, 1881
 Synegia limitata Warren, 1897
 Synegia limitatoides Inoue, 1982
 Synegia lineata Swinhoe, 1902
 Synegia luteolata Snellen, 1880
 Synegia maculosata Warren, 1896
 Synegia malayana Prout, 1925
 Synegia medionubis Prout, 1925
 Synegia medioxima Prout, 1928
 Synegia melanospila Warren, 1907
 Synegia minima Wehrli
 Synegia neglecta Inoue, 1954
 Synegia nephelotis Prout, 1929
 Synegia nigrellata Warren, 1906
 Synegia nigritibiata West, 1929
 Synegia obliquifasciatav Wehrli, 1986
 Synegia obrimaria Walker, 1861
 Synegia obscura Warren, 1894
 Synegia ocellata Warren, 1894
 Synegia omissa Warren, 1894
 Synegia orsinephes Prout, 1928
 Synegia pallens Inoue, 1982
 Synegia phaiotaeniata Wehrli, 1936
 Synegia plumbea Warren, 1906
 Synegia polynesia Prout, 1916
 Synegia potenza Holloway, 1976
 Synegia prospera Prout, 1929
 Synegia punctinervis Holloway, 1976
 Synegia purpurascens Warren, 1894
 Synegia rosearia Leech, 1897
 Synegia saturata West, 1929
 Synegia scutigera Warren, 1906
 Synegia secunda Swinhoe, 1909
 Synegia semifascia Warren, 1906
 Synegia semipectinata Prout, 1916
 Synegia sericearia Walker, 1866
 Synegia similis West, 1929
 Synegia subomissa Wehrli, 1939
 Synegia suffusa Prout, 1915
 Synegia tephrospila Warren, 1906
 Synegia tertia West, 1929
 Synegia transgrisea Holloway, 1976
 Synegia unicolor Wileman, 1911
 Synegia uniformis Inoue, 1954
 Synegia varians Warren, 1894
 Synegia wehrlii Bryk, 1942

References

External links

Baptini
Ennominae